Chirchir may refer to:

Geography
Chirchir, Armenia
Chirchir, Iran, a village in East Azerbaijan Province, Iran
 Chirchir secondary school. Located in Uasin Gishu county in Kenya, near Timboroa.

People
Cornelius Chirchir (born 1983), Kenyan middle-distance runner and 1998 world junior champion
Davis Chirchir (born c. 1960), Kenyan politician and Cabinet Secretary for Energy and Petroleum
Jafred Chirchir Kipchumba (born 1983), Kenyan marathon runner and 2011 Eindhoven Marathon winner
Selina Chirchir (born 1968), Kenyan middle- and long-distance runner and two-time All-Africa Games champion
William Chirchir (born 1979), Kenyan middle-distance runner and 1998 world junior champion
Moses Chirchir (born 1985), Kenyan 800 metres runner for Qatar as Salem Amer Al-Badri

See also
Kipchirchir, a related Kenyan name
Jepchirchir, a related Kenyan name

Kalenjin names